John Kascenska is an American Republican politician who represented the Caledonia 4 district in the Vermont House of Representatives from March 8, 2022 to 2023. He was appointed by Phil Scott on March 7, 2022. In August 2022, he was defeated in the primary by fellow Republican incumbent Terri Lynn Williams.

References 

Living people
21st-century American politicians
Republican Party members of the Vermont House of Representatives
Year of birth missing (living people)